Junaid Wasi is an Indian lyricist. He has written lyrics for the notable Hindi film songs and is active as a lyricist and poet for Bollywood film songs.

Career
Wasi was first noticed as a lyricist after the release of the Bollywood song "Uska Hi Banana" from the Horror flick 1920: The Evil Returns in 2012. His lyrics for "Uska Hi Banana" were acclaimed by "komoi" His other notable works are the lyrics of the Hindi song "Baawra Mann" from the Jolly LLB 2.

Junaid's another romantic song "Zikr" from the movie Amavas with Asad khan & Arman Malik in 2019.

References

Living people
Lyricists
Year of birth missing (living people)